The Latin Rite Roman Catholic Diocese of Dunedin is a suffragan diocese of the Roman Catholic Archdiocese of Wellington. Its cathedral and see city are located in Dunedin, the second-largest city in the South Island of New Zealand. It was formed on 26 November 1869 from a portion of the territory in the Diocese of Wellington, before it was elevated to an archdiocese.

Bishops of Dunedin

Current bishops 
 Michael Dooley, seventh Bishop of Dunedin
 Colin David Campbell, Bishop Emeritus of Dunedin.

Other bishops

Coadjutor bishops
 Hugh John O'Neill (1943–1949), did not succeed to see
 Leonard Anthony Boyle (1983–1985)

Auxiliary bishop
 John Patrick Kavanagh (1949–1957), appointed Bishop here

Other priest of this diocese who became bishop
 James Michael Liston, appointed Coadjutor Bishop of Auckland in 1920

Cathedral
 St. Joseph's Cathedral, Dunedin

Secondary schools

 Trinity Catholic College, Dunedin
 St Kevin's College, Oamaru
 St Peter's College, Gore
 Verdon College, Invercargill

See also
 Holy Cross Seminary
 Holy Name Seminary
 St. Mary's Basilica, Invercargill
 Roman Catholicism in New Zealand
 List of New Zealand Catholic bishops

External links and references
 Catholic Diocese of Dunedin 
 

Dunedin
Dunedin
Dunedin
 
Christianity in Dunedin
1869 establishments in New Zealand